Altair Nanotechnologies Inc. is an American company specializing in the development and manufacturing of energy storage systems for efficient power and energy management. Altair Nantechnologies designs advanced lithium-ion energy systems and batteries.

Battery technology
Altairnano's best-known product are their lithium-ion batteries, produced by Altair's Power and Energy division. The batteries have an anode made of a lithium titanate oxide formed into a spinel structure. The titanate replaces the graphite anodes of typical lithium ion batteries. The batteries are not the only batteries to use nanomaterials, but other batteries, like those from A123 Systems generally replace the cathode rather than the anode.

References

External links
 AltairNano

Battery manufacturers
Electric vehicle battery manufacturers